Mazeh Qola (also Romanized as Māzeh Qolā) is a village in Darreh Kayad Rural District, Sardasht District, Dezful County, Khuzestan Province, Iran. At the 2006 census, its population was 51, in 11 families.

References 

Populated places in Dezful County